This is a listing of all the animated shorts released by Warner Bros. under the Looney Tunes and Merrie Melodies banners between 1940 and 1949.

A total of 307 shorts were released during the 1940s.

1940

1941

1942 
This year marks the beginning of production of color Looney Tunes. For this year and the next, most would still be in black and white.

1943 
The Blue Ribbon Merrie Melodies re-release program starts this year. Previous color Merrie Melodies shorts would be re-released with the original credits cut. In addition, four more Looney Tunes shorts were produced in 3-hue Technicolor. The series would go into full color the following year.

1944 
From this year onward, all cartoons are under copyright and in 3-hue Technicolor.

Leon Schlesinger sold his cartoon studio to Warner Bros. in 1944; Eddie Selzer took over as producer after Buckaroo Bugs was released.

1945

1946

1947 
With the exceptions of A Pest in the House, Mexican Joyride and Catch as Cats Can, every non-Bugs Bunny cartoon released this year was ultimately reissued as a Blue Ribbon Merrie Melodies cartoon.

1948

1949

See also 
 Looney Tunes
 Merrie Melodies
 Censored Eleven
 Looney Tunes Golden Collection
 The Golden Age of Looney Tunes

References

External links 
 The Big Cartoon DataBase entry for Merrie Melodies Cartoons and for Looney Tunes Cartoons
 Golden Age Cartoons' The Ultimate Looney Tunes and Merrie Melodies Website by Jon Cooke
 Official Looney Tunes site

1940s in American cinema
Articles containing video clips
 
 
Warner Bros. Cartoons